Oldham Island is an island in the east part of the Stanton Group, off Mac. Robertson Land. Mapped by Norwegian cartographers from air photos taken by the Lars Christensen Expedition, 1936–37, and named Andoya (duck island). Renamed by Antarctic Names Committee of Australia (ANCA) for Hugh Oldham, biologist and magnetician at Mawson Station in 1955.

See also 
 List of Antarctic and sub-Antarctic islands

Islands of Mac. Robertson Land